The 1987–88 Balkans Cup was an edition of the Balkans Cup, a football competition for representative clubs from the Balkan states. It was contested by 10 teams and Slavia Sofia won the trophy.

Group A

Group B

Group C

Semifinals

First leg

Second leg

Argeș Pitești won 2–1 on aggregate.

Slavia Sofia won 4–2 on aggregate.

Finals

First leg

Second leg

Slavia Sofia won 6–1 on aggregate.

References

External links 

 RSSSF Archive → Balkans Cup
 
 Mehmet Çelik. "Balkan Cup". Turkish Soccer

1987
1987–88 in European football
1988–89 in European football
1987–88 in Romanian football
1988–89 in Romanian football
1987–88 in Greek football
1988–89 in Greek football
1987–88 in Bulgarian football
1988–89 in Bulgarian football
1987–88 in Turkish football
1988–89 in Turkish football
1987–88 in Albanian football
1988–89 in Albanian football